Émile-Joseph Lauvrière (3 December 1866, in Avranches – 1954, in Paris) was a French historian of Acadia.

Emile Lauvrière started his studies in Paris and completed them in London. A doctor in Literature specializing in the English domain, he wrote a dissertation on Edgar Allan Poe, entitled Edgar Poe, un génie morbide later published under the title Edgar Poe, sa vie et son œuvre ; étude de psychologie pathologique (Paris: Alcan, 1904). He then wrote a biography of Alfred de Vigny, before embarking on a course of study similar of Tennyson's versification.

Upon studying Evangeline, Longfellow's poem which follows an Acadian girl during the time of the Expulsion of the Acadians. Lauvrière discovered, on this occasion, the history of the Acadian people, and reoriented his scholarly interest. This new research subject led him to publish La Tragédie d'un peuple; histoire du peuple acadien de ses origines à nos jours (Paris: Bossard, 1922).

Lauvrière was to spend the next three decades studying Acadian history, but he would go beyond academic research by founding the Comité France-Acadie dedicated to providing grants to Acadians wishing to complete their studies in France, as well as sending French-language books to Acadia.

Publications 
  Alfred de Vigny ; sa vie et son œuvre, Paris A. Colin, 1909.
 Repetition and parallelism in Tennyson, Londres, H. Frowde ; Oxford university press, 1910.
  La Tragédie d'un peuple histoire du peuple acadien de ses origines à nos jours, Paris, Bossard, 1922.
  Deux Traîtres d'Acadie et leur victime : les Latour père et fils et Charles d'Aulnaie, Montréal, Granger frères, 1932.
  Histoire de la Louisiane française, 1673-1939, Paris, Librairie Orientale et Américaine, 1940.
  Brève Histoire tragique du peuple acadien : son martyr et sa résurrection, Paris, A. Maisonneuve, 1947.
  Autobiographie, Memramcook, Université Saint-Joseph, 1952.

20th-century French historians
Acadian history
People from Manche
1866 births
1954 deaths
French male non-fiction writers